The 42nd Arizona State Legislature, consisting of the Arizona State Senate and the Arizona House of Representatives, was constituted in Phoenix from January 1, 1995, to December 31, 1996, during the first two years of Fife Symington's second term as governor. Both the Senate and the House membership remained constant at 30 and 60, respectively. The Republicans increased their control in the Senate, gaining a seat and giving the a 19-11 majority. The Republicans also gained seats in the house, increasing their majority to 38–22.

Sessions
The Legislature met for two regular sessions at the State Capitol in Phoenix. The first opened on January 9, 1995, and adjourned on April 13, while the Second Regular Session convened on January 8, 1996, and adjourned sine die on April 20.

There were seven Special Sessions, the first of which was convened on March 14, 1995, and adjourned on March 16; the second convened on March 23, 1995, and adjourned sine die on March 28; the third convened on October 17, 1995, and adjourned sine die later that same day; the fourth convened on December 11, 1995, and adjourned sine die on December 13; the fifth convened on March 13, 1996, and adjourned sine die March 26; the sixth convened on June 26, 1996, and adjourned sine die that same day; the seventh convened on July 16, 1996, and adjourned sine die on July 18.

State Senate

Members

The asterisk (*) denotes members of the previous Legislature who continued in office as members of this Legislature.

House of Representatives

Members 
The asterisk (*) denotes members of the previous Legislature who continued in office as members of this Legislature.

References

Arizona legislative sessions
1995 in Arizona
1996 in Arizona
1995 U.S. legislative sessions
1996 U.S. legislative sessions